The United Nations World Water Development Report (WWDR) is a global report that provides an authoritative, comprehensive assessment of the world’s freshwater resources.  It is produced annually by the World Water Assessment Programme and released by UN-Water.

The report examines the ways that the world’s water resources are being managed and the varied water problems that different regions of the world are experiencing. It takes a close look at growing water problems worldwide, such as access to clean water and sanitation, and the cross-cutting issues which affect them, such as: energy, climate change, agriculture, and urban growth.  The report also offers recommendations on how freshwater resources could be managed more sustainably.

The content of the report comes from the coordinated efforts of 26 UN agencies that make up UN-Water, working with governments, international organizations, non-governmental organizations and other stakeholders. 

In 2018, the topic of the report was "Nature-based Solutions for Water". In 2017, the topic of the report was "Wastewater: The Untapped Resource".

Background
In 1998, the Sixth Session of the Commission on Sustainable Development stated that there was a need for regular, global assessments on the status of freshwater resources.  In response to this recommendation, the member organizations of UN-Water (known then as the ACC Subcommittee on Water Resources) decided to produce a World Water Development Report every three years, with an aim to reporting on the status of global freshwater resources and the progress achieved in reaching the Millennium Development Goals related to water.

Objectives
The UN World Water Development Reports monitor changes in the world’s freshwater resources and their management. They track progress towards achieving international development targets, particularly those of the Millennium Development Goals (MDGs) and offer best practices as well as in-depth theoretical analyses to help stimulate ideas and actions for better stewardship in the water sector.

The WWDRs also include the findings of case study development projects initiated in different geographic regions of the world. The case studies provide an in-depth analysis of the state of freshwater resources and related challenges that directly affect the livelihoods of people in the societies. In the production of WWDRs, more than 64 countries have been covered at basin or national level.

Reports

2019: Leave No One behind 
The 2019 report was entitled "Leaving No One Behind". It explained how water resources management and access to water supply and sanitation services help to overcome poverty and various other social and economic inequities. It was launched at the Human Rights Council in Geneva on 19 March 2019.

2018: Nature for Water 
The 2018 report was launched 19 March 2018 during the 8th World Water Forum, and in conjunction to the World Water Day (22 March 2018). Its title was "Nature-based Solutions for Water".

2017: Wastewater: The Untapped Resource

2012: Managing Water under Uncertainty and Risk 
The fourth report was launched at the sixth World Water Forum in Marseille, France in March 2012. Its title was "Managing Water under Uncertainty and Risk".

2009: Water in a Changing World

The third report, “Water in a Changing World”, was launched at the fifth World Water Forum held in Istanbul, Turkey in March, 2009.

Unlike the earlier Reports, which were structured along UN agency lines, “Water in a Changing World” took a holistic approach, addressing a number of themes throughout the report, such as climate change, the Millennium Development Goals (MDGs), groundwater, biodiversity, water and migration, water and infrastructure, and biofuels. The Report has four main sections, apart from the introduction and the recommendations: “drivers of change,” “the use of the resource for humans and for ecosystems,” “the state of the resource,” and “responding to a changing world: what are the options?”

Case Studies:  The third report is accompanied by the first stand-alone volume of WWAP case studies, titled "Facing the Challenges", which includes 20 studies from Africa, Asia and the Pacific, Europe and Latin America, where conditions of water-related stress and socio-economic settings vary widely.  Case studies include the Autonomous Community of the Basque Country (Spain), Bangladesh, Cameroon, China, the Cholistan desert (Pakistan), Estonia, the Han River basin (Republic of Korea), Istanbul (Turkey), the Lake Merín basin (Brazil and Uruguay), La Plata River basin (Argentina, Bolivia, Brazil, Paraguay and Uruguay), the Netherlands, Pacific island states, the Po River basin (Italy), Sri Lanka, Sudan, Swaziland, Tunisia, Uzbekistan, the Vuoksi River basin (Finland and the Russian Federation) and Zambia.

Links to Report and related materials:
 UN World Water Development Report 3: "Water in a Changing World" and "Facing the Challenges" (2009) http://www.unesco.org/new/en/natural-sciences/environment/water/wwap/wwdr/wwdr3-2009/downloads-wwdr3/
 Facts and Figures [1.5 MB, full-color PDF] http://www.unesco.org/new/fileadmin/MULTIMEDIA/HQ/SC/pdf/WWDR3_Facts_and_Figures.pdf
 Messages http://www.unesco.org/water/wwap/wwdr/wwdr3/messages.shtml
 Side Publications Series http://www.unesco.org/water/wwap/wwdr/wwdr3/side_publications.shtml

2006: Water: A Shared Responsibility (2006)

The second WWDR, “Water: A Shared Responsibility,” was presented in 2006 at the fourth World Water Forum in Mexico City, Mexico.  Building on the conclusions of the first WWDR, the Report provides an assessment of freshwater resources in all regions and most countries of the world as it tracks progress towards the water-related targets of the UN Millennium Development Goals. It examines a range of key issues including population growth and increasing urbanization, changing ecosystems, food production, health, industry and energy, as well as risk management, valuing and paying for water and increasing knowledge and capacity. Sixteen case studies look at typical water resource challenges and provide valuable insights into different facets of the water crisis and management responses.  Finally, the report outlines a set of conclusions and recommendations to guide future action and encourage sustainable use, productivity and management of our increasingly scarce freshwater resources.

Case studies: The second report contains 16 case studies, including the Autonomous Community of the Basque Country (Spain), the Danube River Basin (Albania, Austria, Bosnia-Herzegovina, Bulgaria, Croatia, the Czech Republic, Germany, Hungary, Italy, the Republic of Macedonia, Moldova, Poland, Romania, Serbia and Montenegro, the Slovak Republic, Slovenia, Switzerland and Ukraine), Ethiopia, France, Japan, Kenya, Lake Peipsi (Estonia and the Russian Federation), Lake Titicaca (Peru and Bolivia), Mali, Mexico, Mongolia, the La Plata River Basin (Brazil, Bolivia, Paraguay, Argentina, and Uruguay), South Africa and Sri Lanka.

Links to report and related materials:
 UN World Water Development Report 2: Water: A Shared Responsibility (2006) http://www.unesco.org/water/wwap/wwdr/wwdr2
 Executive Summary http://unesdoc.unesco.org/images/0014/001444/144409E.pdf

2003: Water for People, Water for Life (2003)

The first UN World Water Development Report, called “Water for People, Water for Life” was presented at the third World Water Forum in Japan in 2003. The report provides an assessment of the globe’s water crisis; reviews progress and trends; proposes methodologies and indicators for measuring sustainability; assesses progress in 11 challenge areas (health, food, environment, shared water resources, cities, industry, energy, risk management, knowledge, valuing water and governance); and presents seven pilot case studies of river basins representing various social, economic and environmental settings.

Case Studies: The first Report looked at seven case studies, including the Chao Phraya River basin (Thailand), Greater Tokyo (Japan), Lake Peipsi/Chudskoe-Pskovskoe (Estonia, Russian Federation), Lake Titicaca basin (Bolivia, Peru), Ruhuna basins (Sri Lanka), Seine-Normandy basin (France), and the Senegal River basin (Guinea, Mali, Mauritania, Senegal).

Links to report and related materials:
 UN World Water Development Report 1: Water: A Shared Responsibility (2006) http://www.unesco.org/water/wwap/wwdr/wwdr1
 Executive Summary http://www.unesco.org/water/wwap/wwdr/wwdr1/ex_summary/index.shtml

See also
 World Water Assessment Programme
 UNESCO
 Freshwater
 Sustainable Development Goals
 World Water Forum

External links
 World Water Assessment Programme
 UN-Water

References

Water and politics
Water
Millennium Development Goals
Articles containing video clips